Batrachedrodes lomentella is a moth of the family Momphidae. It was first described by Lord Walsingham in 1907. It is endemic to the Hawaiian islands of Oahu and Hawaii.

The larvae have been found among the dead leaves of an unidentified fern.

References

External links

Momphidae
Endemic moths of Hawaii
Moths described in 1907